"Angel" is a song by British singer and songwriter Kirsty MacColl, released in 1993 as the lead single from her fourth studio album Titanic Days. It was written by MacColl and produced by Steve Lillywhite. For its release as a single, "Angel" was remixed with additional production by Gregg Jackman. The song reached number 87 in the UK Singles Chart and number 26 on the US Billboard Modern Rock Tracks chart.

Background
Speaking to Melinda Newman of Billboard, MacColl said of the song: "It's a euphoric song. It's kind of a feeling of being protected. It makes me feel better when I hear that one." The artwork on the single's sleeve is from the 1989 painting "Guardian Angel" by Holly Johnson.

Critical reception
On its release, Music & Media commented, "The holiday season will last a little longer with this folk song in a Christmas atmosphere. Traditional instruments and the modern rhythm track are living in perfect harmony." Andrew Hirst of the Huddersfield Daily Examiner picked "Angel" as the newspaper's "single of the week" and praised it as a "Kirsty is one of Britain's top songstresses with the voice to match. Starts with mournful bagpipes and then gets better and better. Sincere, sensitive, honest – in short, first-rate."

In a review of Titanic Days, Peter Holmes of The Sydney Morning Herald wrote: "By track 3 MacColl has hit her stride. "Angel", with its gentle hip hop rhythm and floating vocal, sounds as if it were written for her by Single Gun Theory, no small compliment." Dave Hall of the Tampa Bay Times noted: "The songs themselves are exceptional. "Angel" soars amid a hypnotic dance tempo".

Ira Robbins of Trouser Press commented: "The evanescent "Angel" has a bustling club beat and pizzicato violin plucks." Gary Graff, in his book MusicHound Rock: The Essential Album Guide noted the song's "mutant dub/hip-hop beat supporting MacColl's ethereal vocals". Billboard picked the song as one of the album's "high points". In 2005, Stephen M. Deusner of Pitchfork wrote: "Songs like "Soho Square" and "Angel" are shot through with a anticipation for something enormous and life-changing, whether good or bad."

Track listing
7" single
"Angel" - 3:40
"Angel" (Jay's Edit) - 3:52

12" single
"Angel" - 3:40
"Angel" (Apollo 440 Remix) - 8:08
"Angel" (Jay's Edit) - 3:52
"Angel" (Stuart Crichton Remix) - 5:33

CD single
"Angel" - 3:40
"Angel" (Jay's Edit) - 3:52
"Angel" (Apollo 440 Remix) - 8:08
"Angel" (Stuart Crichton Remix) - 6:24
"Angel" (Into The Light Mix) - 5:33

Personnel
 Kirsty MacColl - vocals, guitar
 Mark E. Nevin - guitar
 Pete Glenister - guitar
 Gary Tibbs - bass
 David Ruffy - drums
 Ken Rice - violin

Production
 Steve Lillywhite - producer
 Gregg Jackman - additional production and remixing on single version of "Angel"
 Apollo 440, Stuart Crichton - remixes

Other
 Holly Johnson - cover painting

Charts

References

1993 songs
1993 singles
Kirsty MacColl songs
Songs written by Kirsty MacColl
Song recordings produced by Steve Lillywhite
ZTT Records singles